Biotin deficiency is a nutritional disorder which can become serious, even fatal, if allowed to progress untreated. It can occur in people of any age, ancestry, or of either sex. Biotin is part of the B vitamin family. Biotin deficiency rarely occurs among healthy people because the daily requirement of biotin is low, many foods provide adequate amounts of it, intestinal bacteria synthesize small amounts of it, and the body effectively scavenges and recycles it in the kidneys during production of urine. However, deficiencies can be caused by consuming raw egg whites over a period of weeks to months. Egg whites contain high levels of avidin, a protein that binds biotin strongly. When cooked, avidin is partially denatured and binding to biotin is reduced. However one study showed that 30-40% of the avidin activity was still present in the white after frying or boiling.  Genetic disorders such as biotinidase deficiency, multiple carboxylase deficiency, and holocarboxylase synthetase deficiency can also lead to inborn or late-onset forms of biotin deficiency. In all cases – dietary, genetic, or otherwise – supplementation with biotin is the primary method of treatment.

Signs and symptoms 
Rashes including red, patchy ones near the mouth (erythematous periorofacial macular rash)
Fine and brittle hair

Psychological
Hallucinations
Lethargy
Mild depression, which may progress to profound fatigue and, eventually, to somnolence
Generalized muscular pains (myalgia)
Paresthesias

Causes 

 Total parenteral nutrition without biotin supplementation: Several cases of biotin deficiency in patients receiving prolonged total parenteral nutrition (TPN) therapy without added biotin have been reported. Therefore, all patients receiving TPN must also receive biotin at the recommended daily dose, especially if TPN therapy is expected to last more than 1 week. All hospital pharmacies currently include biotin in TPN preparations.
Protein deficiency: A shortage of proteins involved in biotin homeostasis can cause biotin deficiency. The main problems involved in biotin homeostasis are HCS, BTD (biotinidase deficiency) and SMVT
 Anticonvulsant therapy: Prolonged use of certain drugs (especially highly common prescription anti-seizure medications such as phenytoin, primidone, and carbamazepine), may lead to biotin deficiency; however, valproic acid therapy is less likely to cause this condition. Some anticonvulsants (antiepileptic drugs) inhibit biotin transport across the intestinal mucosa. Evidence suggests that these anticonvulsants accelerate biotin catabolism, which means that it's necessary for people to take supplemental biotin, in addition to the usual minimum daily requirements, if they're treated with anticonvulsant medication(s) that have been linked to biotin deficiency.
Severe malnourishment
 Prolonged oral antibiotic therapy: Prolonged use of oral antibiotics has been associated with biotin deficiency. Alterations in the intestinal flora caused by the prolonged administration of antibiotics are presumed to be the basis for biotin deficiency.
 Genetic mutation: Mikati et al. (2006) reported a case of partial biotinidase deficiency (plasma biotinidase level of 1.3 nm/min/mL) in a 7-month-old boy. The boy presented with perinatal distress followed by developmental delay, hypotonia, seizures, and infantile spasms without alopecia or dermatitis. The child's neurologic symptoms abated following biotin supplementation and antiepileptic drug therapy. DNA mutational analysis revealed that the child was homozygous for a novel E64K mutation and that his mother and father were heterozygous for the novel E64K mutation.

Potential causes 
Smoking: Recent studies suggest that smoking can lead to marginal biotin deficiency because it speeds up biotin catabolism (especially in women).
Excessive alcohol consumption
Excessive consumption of antidiuretics or inadequate levels of antidiuretic hormone
Intestinal malabsorption caused by short bowel syndrome

Biochemistry 
Biotin is a coenzyme for five carboxylases in the human body (propionyl-CoA carboxylase, methylcrotonyl-CoA carboxylase, pyruvate carboxylase, and 2 forms of acetyl-CoA carboxylase.) Therefore, biotin is essential for amino acid catabolism, gluconeogenesis, and fatty acid metabolism. Biotin is also necessary for gene stability because it is covalently attached to histones. Biotinylated histones play a role in repression of transposable elements and some genes. Normally, the amount of biotin in the body is regulated by dietary intake, biotin transporters (monocarboxylate transporter 1 and sodium-dependent multivitamin transporter), peptidyl hydrolase biotinidase (BTD), and the protein ligase holocarboxylase synthetase. When any of these regulatory factors are inhibited, biotin deficiency could occur.

Diagnosis 
The most reliable and commonly used methods for determining biotin status in the body are:
excretion of 3-hydroxyisovaleric acid and biotin in urine
 activity of propionyl-CoA carboxylase in lymphocytes

Treatment 
In the United States, biotin supplements are readily available without a prescription in amounts ranging from 300 to 10,000 micrograms (30 micrograms is identified as Adequate Intake).

Epidemiology 
Since biotin is present in many foods at low concentrations, deficiency is rare except in locations where malnourishment is very common. Pregnancy, however, alters biotin catabolism and despite a regular biotin intake, half of the pregnant women in the U.S. are marginally biotin deficient.

See also 
 Biotinidase deficiency
Holocarboxylase synthetase deficiency
Multiple carboxylase deficiency

References

Possible references

External links 
 GeneReviews/NCBI/NIH/UW entry on Biotinidase deficiency
 OMIM entries on Biotinidasa deficiency

Vitamin deficiencies